The Viotti International Music Festival was founded in 1997 in the town of Vercelli, after the discovery of unpublished compositions by Giovanni Battista Viotti.   Concerts are held at the Basilica of Saint Andrew, the Civic Theater and the Church of Saint Christopher in Vercelli.  

The festival has featured soloists included Uto Ughi, Salvatore Accardo, Cecilia Gasdia, Vladimir Spivakov, Maxence Larrieu, Katia Ricciarelli, Ruggiero Ricci, Shlomo Mintz, Luciana Serra, Mischa Maisky. The festival is linked to the Orchestra Camerata Ducale a Vercelli, who is recording the complete works of Viotti for Bongiovanni, Naxos e Chandos.

International festivals
In response to international calls Viotti Festivals have been organized elsewhere in the world:
 2005, Johannesburg and Pretoria, South Africa, via the ambassador of Italy in Pretoria 
 2005 and 2006,  Miami and Orlando, Florida 
 2009, The Villages, Florida

References

External links
 
 Camerata Ducale Orchestra

Opera festivals
Summer festivals
Vercelli
Tourist attractions in Piedmont